Marc Daviaud (born December 27, 1958 in Machecoul, France) is a retired French professional footballer. He played as a goalkeeper.

See also
Football in France
List of football clubs in France

References

External links
Marc Daviaud profile at chamoisfc79.fr

1958 births
Living people
French footballers
Association football goalkeepers
FC Nantes players
Chamois Niortais F.C. players
Bourges 18 players
Ligue 2 players
SO Cholet players